Puya ferruginea is a plant species in the genus Puya. This species is native to Bolivia and Ecuador.

References

ferruginea
Flora of Bolivia
Flora of Ecuador